Olinia emarginata, the mountain hard pear or berghardepeer in Afrikaans language, is a tree species in the genus Olinia native to South Africa.

Prunasin, a cyanogenic glucoside, can be found in the leaves of O. emarginata.

See also
 List of Southern African indigenous trees and woody lianes
 Forests of KwaZulu-Natal

References

External links 

 http://plants.jstor.org

Penaeaceae
Flora of South Africa